Juan Cortiñas Méndez, known as Juanín (born 24 October 1925) was a Spanish professional footballer who played as a midfielder.

Career
Born in Monforte de Lemos, Juanín played for Celta Vigo and Deportivo La Coruña.

References

1925 births
Possibly living people
Spanish footballers
RC Celta de Vigo players
Deportivo de La Coruña players
Association football midfielders